The Pure Wargame, Vol. 1: Death From Above is a 1995 video game developed and published by Quantum Quality Productions for MS-DOS compatible computers.

Gameplay
The Pure Wargame is a wargame which focuses on the airborne assaults of World War II.

Reception

Next Generation gave it three stars out of five and stated, "Even war gaming newbies should be able to get into Death From Above with no trouble. There's some question, however, about whether or not they'll want to. For someone unfamiliar with the wargaming experience, this one can be overwhelming."

Reviews
PC Gamer Vol. 2 No. 7 (1995 July)
Computer Gaming World (Jul, 1995)

References

1995 video games
Computer wargames
DOS games
DOS-only games
Quantum Quality Productions games
Turn-based strategy video games
Video games developed in the United States